Alejandro Felipe ( : born 18 December 1998) is a Mexican television and film actor, better known for his role as "Frijolito" in Amarte así, and his appearances in Amor Real, La Viuda de Blanco and Mujer, casos de la vida real.

Filmography

References

External links

1998 births
Living people
Mexican male child actors
Mexican male telenovela actors
Mexican male film actors
Male actors from Tabasco
People from Villahermosa
21st-century Mexican male actors